The 2013 Wimbledon Championships was a tennis tournament played on grass courts at the All England Lawn Tennis and Croquet Club in Wimbledon, London in the United Kingdom. It was the 127th edition of the Wimbledon Championships and were held from 24 June to 7 July 2013. It was the third Grand Slam tennis event of the year and was part of the ATP World Tour, the WTA Tour, the ITF Junior Tour and the NEC Tour. The championships were organised by the All England Lawn Tennis and Croquet Club and the International Tennis Federation.

Roger Federer and Serena Williams were the defending champions in singles events, but neither was able to repeat their success: Federer was eliminated in the second round by Sergiy Stakhovsky, and Williams lost in the fourth round to Sabine Lisicki. This marked the first time since 1927 that both defending champions were eliminated before the quarterfinals. Federer and Williams were two of a number of big-name casualties in the early rounds, along with two-time champion Rafael Nadal, two-time semifinalist Jo-Wilfried Tsonga, 2004 champion Maria Sharapova and former World No. 1s Victoria Azarenka, Ana Ivanovic, Lleyton Hewitt, Caroline Wozniacki and Jelena Janković.

Andy Murray became the first man from Great Britain to win the singles title since Fred Perry in 1936. Marion Bartoli won the women's singles title. Bob and Mike Bryan completed the "Bryan Slam" and became the first team to hold all four Grand Slams and the Olympic Gold at the same time.

Tournament

The 2013 Wimbledon Championships was the 127th edition of the tournament and was held at All England Lawn Tennis and Croquet Club in London.

The tournament was an event run by the International Tennis Federation (ITF) and was part of the 2013 ATP World Tour and the 2013 WTA Tour calendars under the Grand Slam category. The tournament consisted of both men's and women's singles and doubles draws as well as a mixed doubles event.

There were singles and doubles events for both boys and girls (players under 18), which was part of the Grade A category of tournaments, and doubles events for men's and women's wheelchair tennis players as part of the NEC tour under the Grand Slam category. The tournament was played on grass courts and was taking place over a series of 19 courts, including the four main showcourts, Centre Court, No. 1 Court, No. 2 Court and No. 3 Court.

Notable events

 Rafael Nadal suffered his first ever opening round defeat at a Grand Slam tournament when he lost to Steve Darcis in the first round. This also marked the first time since 1997 in which the reigning French Open men's champion lost in the first round at Wimbledon. Women's fifth seed Sara Errani also made a first round exit, losing to Monica Puig in straight sets.
 By defeating Benjamin Becker in the first round, Andy Murray won his 107th Grand Slam match, thus becoming the most successful British man at a Major and breaking Fred Perry's total Grand Slam match win record of 106.
 The 2013 championship was also known for having numerous players retire in the first two rounds due to fatigue or injury, most notably Marin Čilić, Jo-Wilfried Tsonga, Victoria Azarenka, John Isner, and first round surprise Steve Darcis. On Wednesday, 26 June a total of eight players, including seven in singles events, withdrew from the tournament; four of those made the decision before the starts of their matches.
 Third-ranked Roger Federer fell in the second round to world number 116 Sergiy Stakhovsky, his first loss in a Grand Slam earlier than the Quarterfinals since 2004 French Open, a streak spanning 36 majors. Federer's world ranking dropped to No. 5 as a result of this early exit.
 Federer's second round loss also marked the worst collective performance by him and Rafael Nadal at a Grand Slam tournament, in which both men were entered. This also marked the first time since 2002 in which neither man made the Wimbledon final.
 For the first time since 1912, no U.S. man was represented in the third round at Wimbledon, following Bobby Reynolds's second round defeat to World No. 1 Novak Djokovic.
 Kimiko Date-Krumm became the oldest woman to reach the third round at Wimbledon, by defeating Alexandra Cadanțu in the second round. It is also the first time since the 1996 Wimbledon Championships in which she has gone this far. Her opponent, number one seed Serena Williams, combined for an age of 73, and this was their first ever meeting. Date-Krumm lost in straight sets in the late evening encounter on Saturday 29 June 2013.
 Of the top ten women's seeds that started the Championships, six fell before the third round: second seed Victoria Azarenka (second round, withdrew), third seed Maria Sharapova (second round), fifth seed Sara Errani (first round), seventh seed Angelique Kerber (second round), ninth seed Caroline Wozniacki (second round) and tenth seed Maria Kirilenko (first round). This marked the worst performance by any top ten seeds at a Grand Slam tournament in the Open Era.
 Laura Robson became the first British woman in 15 years to reach the fourth round at Wimbledon; by getting this far, she entered the Top 30 for the first time in her career. She thus became the first British woman since Jo Durie in 1987 to enter the WTA's Top 30.
 Łukasz Kubot and Fernando Verdasco both reached the quarter-finals of Wimbledon for the first time, whilst Juan Martín del Potro reached his first Grand Slam semi-final since winning the 2009 US Open.
 Sloane Stephens and Kirsten Flipkens both reached the quarter-finals at Wimbledon for the first time.
 Sabine Lisicki continued her record of beating the reigning French Open champion at Wimbledon. She defeated Serena Williams in the fourth round, having also beaten Svetlana Kuznetsova in 2009, Li Na in 2011 and Maria Sharapova in 2012. Lisicki's victory also denied Serena her 35th consecutive victory, a record which was achieved by her older sister, Venus, in 2000.
 This tournament marked the worst collective performance by Williams, Victoria Azarenka and Maria Sharapova at a Grand Slam event since the 2008 French Open, and also the first tournament since the 2011 French Open in which none of the three reached a Grand Slam final.
 Jerzy Janowicz became the first male Polish player to reach the semi-finals of a Grand Slam tournament.
 By reaching the Wimbledon final, Sabine Lisicki became the first German Grand Slam singles finalist since Rainer Schüttler reached the final of the 2003 Australian Open, and the first German singles finalist at Wimbledon since Steffi Graf in 1999.
 Novak Djokovic won his semi-final match against Juan Martín del Potro in five sets in 4 hours 44 minutes. This was the longest semi-final in the history of the Wimbledon Championships.
 With her win in the Ladies' Singles final, Marion Bartoli surpassed the female record set by Jana Novotná at the 1998 Wimbledon Championships for most appearances in a Grand Slam tournament before winning a title, with 47.
 In winning the Gentlemen's Doubles, Bob and Mike Bryan became the first men's doubles team in the Open era to hold all four Grand Slam titles at the same time, as well as the only team in history to hold all four Majors and the Olympic gold medal.
Andy Murray defeated Novak Djokovic in the final in straight sets to win the 2013 Wimbledon Men Singles title, becoming the first British man in 77 years to do so, and the first Scot of either sex in 117 years to win a Wimbledon singles title.

First Wednesday
The first Wednesday (Wednesday 26 June) in the 2013 Wimbledon Championship saw a number of former world number ones knocked out in the second round of the draw either by being beaten by a much lower rank, having to retire early or having been "walked over". These players include Roger Federer, Maria Sharapova and Victoria Azarenka, as well as former ranking leaders Lleyton Hewitt, Ana Ivanovic, Jelena Janković and Caroline Wozniacki. Other notable players, including Jo-Wilfried Tsonga, Marin Čilić, John Isner, Steve Darcis, Yaroslava Shvedova and Radek Štěpánek also went out. A total of twelve seeded players (five men and seven women) finished their 2013 Wimbledon campaign on that day.

Events from "Black Wednesday" were highly commented, inter alia by the Association of Tennis Professionals and players and a statement from tournament Chief Executive Officer has been released.

Point and prize money distribution

Point distribution
Below is a series of tables for each of the competitions showing the ranking points on offer for each event.

Seniors points

Wheelchair points

Junior points

Prize money
The Wimbledon total prize money for 2013 has been increased by forty percent to £22,560,000 (around $34m). The winners of the men's and women's singles titles earned £1.6m, up £450,000 from last year. In the 2013 season, the Wimbledon prize money was the highest out of four grand slam tournaments, compared to $30m at the Australian Open, $29m at French Open, and $32m at the US Open.

* per team

Singles players
Men's singles

Women's singles

Day-by-day summaries

Champions

Seniors

Men's singles

 Andy Murray def.  Novak Djokovic, 6–4, 7–5, 6–4 
 It was Murray's fourth title of the year and first Grand Slam title of the year. It was his first Wimbledon title, second Grand Slam title and 28th career title.

Women's singles

 Marion Bartoli def.  Sabine Lisicki, 6–1, 6–4 
 It was Bartoli's first (and only) Grand Slam title in her career and eighth singles title overall. It was also her final Grand Slam appearance before she would retire in August 2013.

Men's doubles

 Bob Bryan /  Mike Bryan def.  Ivan Dodig /  Marcelo Melo, 3–6, 6–3, 6–4, 6–4 
 It was the Bryan brothers' ninth title of the year and third Grand Slam title of the year. It was their third Wimbledon title, 15th Grand Slam title and 91st career title. They completed a non-calendar year Golden Slam and thus became the first double team in tennis history to hold all four majors as well as Olympic gold medal at the same time.

Women's doubles

 Hsieh Su-wei /  Peng Shuai def.  Ashleigh Barty /  Casey Dellacqua, 7–6(7–1), 6–1 
 It was their second title of the year and the first Grand Slam title for both players. It was Hsieh's 11th and Peng's 9th title in their careers.

Mixed doubles

 Daniel Nestor /  Kristina Mladenovic def.  Bruno Soares /  Lisa Raymond, 5–7, 6–2, 8–6

Juniors

Boys' singles

 Gianluigi Quinzi def.  Chung Hyeon, 7–5, 7–6(7–2)

Girls' singles

 Belinda Bencic def.  Taylor Townsend, 4–6, 6–1, 6–4

Boys' doubles

 Thanasi Kokkinakis /  Nick Kyrgios def.  Enzo Couacaud /  Stefano Napolitano, 6–2, 6–3

Girls' doubles

 Barbora Krejčíková /  Kateřina Siniaková def.  Anhelina Kalinina /  Iryna Shymanovich, 6–3, 6–1

Invitation

Gentlemen's invitation doubles

 Thomas Enqvist /  Mark Philippoussis def.  Greg Rusedski /  Fabrice Santoro, 7–6(8–6), 6–3

Ladies' invitation doubles

 Lindsay Davenport /  Martina Hingis def.  Jana Novotná /  Barbara Schett, 6–2, 6–2

Senior gentlemen's invitation doubles

 Pat Cash /  Mark Woodforde def.  Jeremy Bates /  Anders Järryd, 6–3, 6–3

Wheelchair

Wheelchair men's doubles

 Stéphane Houdet /  Shingo Kunieda def.  Frédéric Cattaneo /  Ronald Vink, 6–4, 6–2

Wheelchair women's doubles

 Jiske Griffioen /  Aniek van Koot def.  Yui Kamiji /  Jordanne Whiley, 6–4, 7–6(8–6)

Singles seeds
The following are the seeded players and notable players who withdrew from the event. Seeds based on ATP and WTA rankings are as of 17 June 2013 and the rankings and points are as of 24 June 2013.

Men's singles
The Men's singles seeds is arranged on a surface-based system to reflect more accurately the individual player's grass court achievement as per the following formula, which applies to the top 32 players, according to ATP ranking on 17 June 2013:
 Take Entry System Position (ESP) points at 17 June 2013
 Add 100% points earned for all grass court tournaments in the past 12 months (18 June 2012 – 16 June 2013).
 Add 75% points earned for best grass court tournament in the 12 months before that (13 June 2011 – 17 June 2012)

† The player did not qualify for the tournament in 2012. Accordingly, it is the defending points from the 2012 ATP Challenger Tour instead.

Women's singles
For the Women's singles seeds, the seeding order follows the ranking list, except where in the opinion of the committee, the grass court credentials of a particular player necessitates a change in the interest of achieving a balanced draw.

† The player did not qualify for the tournament in 2012. Accordingly, points for her 16th best result are deducted instead.

The following player would have been seeded, but she withdrew from the event.

Main draw wild card entries
The following players received wild cards into the main draw senior events.

Men's singles
  Matthew Ebden
  Kyle Edmund
  Steve Johnson
  Nicolas Mahut
  James Ward

Women's singles
  Elena Baltacha
  Lucie Hradecká
  Anne Keothavong
  Johanna Konta
  Tara Moore
  Samantha Murray
  Andrea Petkovic
  Alison Riske

Men's doubles
  Jamie Baker /  Kyle Edmund
  Lleyton Hewitt /  Mark Knowles
  David Rice /  Sean Thornley

Women's doubles
  Anne Keothavong /  Johanna Konta
  Tara Moore /  Melanie South
  Samantha Murray /  Jade Windley
  Shahar Pe'er /  Yan Zi
  Nicola Slater /  Lisa Whybourn

Mixed doubles
  James Blake /  Donna Vekić
  Jamie Delgado /  Tara Moore
  Kyle Edmund /  Eugenie Bouchard
  Dominic Inglot /  Johanna Konta
  Mark Knowles /  Sabine Lisicki

Qualifiers entries
Below are the lists of the qualifiers entering in the main draws.

Men's singles

Men's singles qualifiers
  Stéphane Robert
  Bastian Knittel
  Julian Reister
  Wayne Odesnik
  Dustin Brown
  Denis Kudla
  Jan-Lennard Struff
  Matt Reid
  Jimmy Wang
  James Duckworth
  Michał Przysiężny
  Bobby Reynolds
  Go Soeda
  Alex Kuznetsov
  Marc Gicquel
  Teymuraz Gabashvili

Lucky losers
  Olivier Rochus

Women's singles

Women's singles qualifiers
  Carina Witthöft
  Galina Voskoboeva
  Caroline Garcia
  Petra Cetkovská
  Ajla Tomljanović
  Maria Elena Camerin
  Yvonne Meusburger
  Virginie Razzano
  Eva Birnerová
  Barbora Záhlavová-Strýcová
  Mariana Duque Mariño
  Michelle Larcher de Brito

Lucky losers
  Vania King
  Anna Karolína Schmiedlová

Men's doubles

Men's doubles qualifiers
  Jesse Levine /  Vasek Pospisil
  Sam Groth /  Chris Guccione
  Dominik Meffert /  Philipp Oswald
  Purav Raja /  Divij Sharan

Lucky losers
  Dustin Brown /  Rameez Junaid
  Steve Johnson /  Andreas Siljeström
  Denis Kudla /  Tim Smyczek

Women's doubles

Women's doubles qualifiers
  Stéphanie Foretz Gacon /  Eva Hrdinová
  María Irigoyen /  Paula Ormaechea
  Raluca Olaru /  Olga Savchuk
  Valeriya Solovyeva /  Maryna Zanevska

Protected ranking
The following players were accepted directly into the main draw using a protected ranking:

Men's Singles
  Igor Andreev (PR 108)
  Jürgen Zopp (PR 88)

Women's Singles
  Michaëlla Krajicek (PR 105)

Withdrawals
The following players were accepted directly into the main tournament, but withdrew with injuries or personal reasons.
Before the tournament

Men's singles
 Brian Baker → replaced by  Steve Darcis 
 Thomaz Bellucci → replaced by  Olivier Rochus
 Nikolay Davydenko → replaced by  Guillaume Rufin
 Mardy Fish → replaced by  Gastão Elias
 Gilles Müller → replaced by  Andreas Haider-Maurer

Women's singles
 Chan Yung-jan → replaced by  Alexa Glatch
 Duan Yingying → replaced by  Petra Martić
 Svetlana Kuznetsova → replaced by  Anna Karolína Schmiedlová
 Venus Williams → replaced by  Vania King
 Aleksandra Wozniak → replaced by  Yulia Putintseva

During the tournament

Men's Singles
 Marin Čilić
 Steve Darcis

Women's Singles
 Victoria Azarenka
 Yaroslava Shvedova

Retirements

Men's Singles
 John Isner
 Philipp Kohlschreiber
 Michaël Llodra
 Paul-Henri Mathieu
 Guido Pella
 Igor Sijsling
 Radek Štěpánek
 Jo-Wilfried Tsonga

Women's singles
 Romina Oprandi

Media coverage

References

External links

 Official Wimbledon Championships website

 
Wimbledon Championships
Wimbledon Championships
Wimbledon Championships
Wimbledon Championships